Clive Campbell may refer to:

DJ Kool Herc (Clive Campbell, born 1955), Jamaican-born DJ
Clive Campbell (cricketer) (born 1951), Jamaican cricketer
Clive Campbell (footballer), New Zealand footballer in the 1970s and early '80s